SR 53 may refer to:

Saunders-Roe SR.53, a rocket-powered jet fighter-interceptor
State Road 53 or State Route 53